Lennart Thy (born 25 February 1992) is a German professional footballer who plays as a striker for Eerste Divisie club PEC Zwolle.

Club career
On 18 January 2016, Werder Bremen announced Thy would be returning to the club for the 2016–17 season. He signed a three-year contract. On 24 September 2016, he scored his first goal for the club since his return after coming on as a substitute in a 2–1 win over VfL Wolfsburg.

In July 2017, Werder Bremen confirmed that Thy would be loaned to Eredivisie side VVV-Venlo for the 2017–18 season.

In July 2018, Thy left Werder Bremen permanently to join Büyükşehir Belediye Erzurumspor, newly promoted to the Süper Lig.

In September 2018, Thy won the FIFA Fair Play Award during the 2018 The Best FIFA Football Awards. He missed an Eredivisie match for VVV Venlo against PSV Eindhoven to save the life of a Leukemia patient in urgent need of matching stem cells for treatment by donating blood. Widespread coverage of this action was followed by an increase in cell donations in the Netherlands.

On 5 January 2019, Thy returned to the Eredivisie signing with PEC Zwolle for 1.5 years.

In May 2020, he agreed to join Sparta Rotterdam, also of the Eredivisie.

In June 2022, Thy returned to former club PEC Zwolle, newly relegated to the Eerste Divisie. He signed a three-year contract. On 3 March 2023, in a league match against FC Den Bosch, Thy came on as a substitute at half-time for Younes Taha and scored a hat-trick in a record-tying 13–0 league victory.

International career
Thy was joint topscorer in the tournament alongside Luc Castaignos as Germany won the 2009 UEFA European Under-17 Championship. Thy scored the equaliser to Castaignos' opener in the final as Germany beat Netherlands 2–1 after-extra-time.

Career statistics

Honours
Germany
 UEFA European Under-17 Championship: 2009 – also joint top scorer

Individual
 FIFA Fair Play Award: 2018

References

External links
 
 

1992 births
Living people
People from Frechen
Sportspeople from Cologne (region)
German footballers
Footballers from North Rhine-Westphalia
Association football forwards
Germany youth international footballers
SV Werder Bremen players
SV Werder Bremen II players
FC St. Pauli players
VVV-Venlo players
Büyükşehir Belediye Erzurumspor footballers
PEC Zwolle players
Sparta Rotterdam players
Bundesliga players
2. Bundesliga players
3. Liga players
Regionalliga players
Eredivisie players
Süper Lig players
Eerste Divisie players
German expatriate footballers
German expatriate sportspeople in the Netherlands
Expatriate footballers in the Netherlands
German expatriate sportspeople in Turkey
Expatriate footballers in Turkey